Omsk Time (OMST) is a time zone in Russia that is six hours ahead of UTC (UTC+06:00), and 3 hours ahead of Moscow Time (MSK). It is used in Omsk Oblast.

History

Until 1991, Omsk Time was one of the two time zones used in Soviet Central Asia. In addition to Omsk Oblast in the Russian SFSR, it covered the eastern two thirds of Kazakh SSR, all of Kyrgyz and Tajik SSRs, and eastern Uzbek SSR. This included the city of Omsk and the capitals Alma-Ata (Almaty), Frunze (Bishkek), Dushanbe and Tashkent.

For two years after the collapse of the Soviet Union, Omsk Oblast remained the only region in Russia in this time zone. The newly independent Central Asian states ceased to observe daylight saving time, while Uzbekistan and Tajikistan in addition "moved west" by adjusting the clocks one hour back.

From the 1990s to the 2010s, Russia experienced a countrywide wave of clock shifts towards Moscow. By 2010, all Western Siberia's Moscow+4 regions moved to Moscow+3, merging into Omsk Time.

In 2011, Russia moved to year-round daylight saving time. Instead of switching between UTC+06:00 in winter and UTC+07:00 in summer, Omsk time was set to UTC+07:00 until 2014, when it was reset back to UTC+06:00 year-round, but Kemerovo Oblast decided to stay in UTC+07:00 - Krasnoyarsk Time.

In 2016, Altai Krai, Altai Republic, Tomsk Oblast  and Novosibirsk oblast switched to Krasnoyarsk Time (UTC+07:00).

Omsk Oblast is now the only part of Russia which uses this time zone.

References

Time zones
Time in Russia